Clay Township is an inactive township in Monroe County, in the U.S. state of Missouri.

Clay Township was established in 1860, and named after Charles S. Clay, a pioneer citizen.

References

Townships in Missouri
Townships in Monroe County, Missouri